Inter College Devkhari (Inter College Mau) is an educational institution located in Chiraiyakot in the Indian state of Uttar Pradesh. It serves boys and girls. It was established in July 2000. 

Intermediate colleges in Uttar Pradesh
High schools and secondary schools in Uttar Pradesh
Mau district
Educational institutions established in 2000
2000 establishments in Uttar Pradesh